The Mount Washington Road Race is a  road running event that follows the auto road going from the base of Mount Washington in New Hampshire nearly to the mountain's summit (located at  above sea level). The race was first held in 1936, and has been run annually since 1966. Women first participated officially in 1972.

The race course rises  feet from start to finish. It is a steep mountain course with an average grade of 12%, all uphill after the first few hundred yards. Held in June each year, Mount Washington is a popular race for runners in New England, and also attracts many runners from other parts of the United States and the world.

For non-elite runners, entry is by lottery. The lottery winners are able to be among the approximately 1,100 runners who partake in this annual event. The lottery is held in mid-March, with a sign-up period from March 1–15. Andy Schachat currently serves as race announcer.

The course record of 56:41 was set in 2004 by renowned mountain runner Jonathan Wyatt. The female course record was set by Shewarge Amarein of Ethiopia with a time of 1:08:21 in 2010. Multiple winners of the race on the men's side include Francis Darrah, Mike Gallagher, Bob Hodge, Gary Crossan, Dave Dunham, Derek Froude, Matt Carpenter, Daniel Kihara, Simon Gutierrez and Eric Blake. On the female side, Eleonora Mendonca, Cathy Hodgdon, Chris Maisto, Jacqueline Gareau, J'ne Day-Lucore, and Anna Pichrtová are multiple winners. John J. Kelley and Jacqueline Gareau are the only runners ever to win both the Boston Marathon and the Mount Washington Road Race. Kelley won the former in 1957 and the latter in 1961. Gareau won Boston in 1980 and won Mt. Washington in 1989, 1994 and 1996.

In addition to having a steep road race course, Mount Washington is home to extremely unpredictable weather. Winds have been known to top  at the summit. Although the race has never been run in such extreme conditions, factors like snow, ice, fog, wind, rain and cold, added to the steep climb, can make the race exceptionally challenging for those who run it. It is not uncommon for temperatures at the foot of the mountain to be warm at the beginning of the race, but for runners to encounter wintry white-out conditions at the summit, even in June. In an attempt to create some levity out of the difficult conditions, race organizers have often used the slogan "only one hill" as the event's official motto.

Winners

See also 

 Mount Washington Auto Road Bicycle Hillclimb
 Mount Washington Hillclimb Auto Race

External links 
 Official site
 Mount Washington Road Race Records by Dave Dunham
 Mount Washington Road Race, statistic page by the Association of Road Racing Statisticians (ARRS)

References 

Mountain running competitions
Coös County, New Hampshire
Road Race
Sports in New Hampshire
Road running competitions in the United States